The Braconidae are a family of parasitoid wasps. After the closely related Ichneumonidae, braconids make up the second-largest family in the order Hymenoptera, with about 17,000 recognized species and many thousands more undescribed. One analysis estimated a total between 30,000 and 50,000, and another provided a narrower estimate between 42,000 and 43,000 species.

Classification
The Braconidae are currently divided into about 47 subfamilies and over 1000 genera, which include Aerophilus, Aleiodes, Apanteles, Asobara, Bracon, Cenocoelius, Chaenusa, Chorebus, Cotesia, Dacnusa, Diachasma, Microgaster, Opius, Parapanteles, Phaenocarpa, Spathius, and Syntretus.

These fall into two major groups, informally called the cyclostomes and noncyclostomes.  In cyclostome braconids, the labrum and the lower part of the clypeus are concave with respect to the upper clypeus and the dorsal margin of the mandibles.  These groups may be clades that diverged early in the evolution of braconids. Cyclostomes are monophyletic whereas noncyclostomes can be divided formally into microgastroids, sigalphoids, helconoids, and euphoroids.

Subfamilies 

Acampsohelconinae
Agathidinae
Alysiinae
Amicrocentrinae
Aphidiinae
Apozyginae
Betylobraconinae
Blacinae
Brachistinae
Braconinae
Cardiochilinae
Cenocoeliinae
Charmontinae
Cheloninae
Dirrhopinae
Doryctinae
Ecnomiinae
Euphorinae
Exothecinae
Gnamptodontinae
Helconinae
Histeromerinae
Homolobinae
Hormiinae
Ichneutinae
Khoikhoiiinae
Lysiterminae
Macrocentrinae
Masoninae
Maxfischeriinae
Mendesellinae
Mesostoinae
Meteorideinae
Meteorinae
Microgastrinae
Microtypinae
Miracinae
Neoneurinae
Opiinae
Orgilinae
Pambolinae
Pselaphaninae
†Protorhyssalinae
Rhysipolinae
Rhyssalinae
Rogadinae
†Seneciobraconinae
Sigalphinae
Telengaiinae
Trachypetinae
Vaepellinae
Xiphozelinae
Ypsistocerinae

Morphology
The morphological variation among braconids is notable. They are often black-brown (sometimes with reddish markings), though some species exhibit striking coloration and patterns, being parts of Müllerian mimicry complexes. They have one or no recurrent veins, unlike other members of the other family in Ichneumonoidea (Ichneumonidae), which usually have two. Wing venation patterns are otherwise highly variable. The antennae typically have 16 segments or more; the trochanters have two segments.

Females often have long ovipositors, an organ that largely varies interspecifically. This variation is closely related to the host species upon which the wasp deposits its egg. Species that parasitize microlepidopterans, for instance, have longer ovipositors, presumably to reach the caterpillar through layers of plant tissue. Some wasps also have long ovipositors to bypass caterpillar defense mechanisms such as spines or hairs, or to reach deeply-burrowed Coleoptera larvae in tree trunks.

Life history

The larvae of most braconids are internal or external primary parasitoids of other insects, especially the larval stages of Coleoptera, Diptera, and Lepidoptera, but also some hemimetabolous insects such as aphids, Heteroptera, or Embiidina. Most species kill their hosts, though some cause the hosts to become sterile and less active. Parasitoidy on adult insects (particularly on Hemiptera and Coleoptera) also occurs. Members of two subfamilies, the Mesostoinae and Doryctinae are known to form galls on plants. Braconids are often used as biological pest control agents, especially against aphids.

Examples of hosts
Thousands of species of insects are used as hosts by braconid wasps. A few notable examples are detailed here.

Some species of braconids are parasitoids of Ostrinia furnacalis (the Asian corn borer, a lepidopteran moth known for being a pest of maize in East Asia), the African sugarcane borer (a moth commonly found in sub-Saharan Africa), the butterfly Danaus chrysippus in Ghana, and Liriomyza trifolii (the American serpentine leafminer) and Manduca quinquemaculata (the tomato hornworm) in North America. Braconids often will prey on fruit fly larvae like Anastrepha suspensa as well.

Polydnaviruses 

Endoparasitoid species often display elaborate physiological adaptations to enhance larval survival within the host, such as the co-option of endosymbiotic viruses for compromising host immune defenses. These bracoviruses are often used by the wasps instead of, or in addition to, a venom cocktail. The DNA of the wasp actually contains portions that are the templates for the components of the viral particles and they are assembled in an organ in the female's abdomen known as the calyx. A 2009 study has traced the origins of these templates to a 100-million-year-old viral infection whose alterations to its host DNA provided the necessary basis for these virus-like "templates".

These viruses suppress the immune system and allow the parasitoid to grow inside the host undetected. The exact function and evolutionary history of these viruses are unknown. Sequences of polydnavirus genes show the possibility that venom-like proteins are expressed inside the host caterpillar. Through the evolutionary history of being used by the wasps, these viruses apparently have become so modified, they appear unlike any other known viruses today. Because of this highly modified system of host immunosuppression, a high level of parasitoid-host specificity is not surprising.

Evolutionary history
The family seems to date from early Cretaceous (provided that Eobracon is properly assigned to this family). It underwent extensive diversification from mid or late Cretaceous to early Cenozoic, correlating with the radiation of flowering plants and associated insect herbivores, the main hosts of braconids.

Differentiation from Ichneumonidae

Braconids are distinguished from their sister group Ichneumonidae by these character combinations. In Braconidae, vein 2m-cu of the forewing is absent except in the Chilean species Apozyx penyai – this vein is present in 95% of Ichneumonidae. Vein 1/Rs+M of the forewing is 85% present in Braconidae, but absent in all Ichneumonidae. Vein 1r-m of the hind wing is in 95% of Braconidae basal to the separation of R1 and Rs (it is opposite or apical in Ichneumonidae). In Braconidae, metasomal tergum 2 is fused with tergum 3, (secondarily flexible in Aphidiinae) – 90% of Ichneumonidae have a flexible suture.

Other characteristics
The species Microplitis croceipes possesses an extremely accurate sense of smell and can be trained for use in narcotics and explosives detection.

At least some braconids appear to be very resistant to ionizing radiation. While a dose of 400 to 1000 rads can kill an average human, a dose of 180,000 rads was required to kill a braconid of genus Habrobracon in an experiment.

Gallery

References

External links

 Braconidae. Tree of Life.
 Braconidae. Encyclopedia of Life.
 Sharkey, M. J. (2004). Synopsis of the Agathidinae (Hymenoptera: Braconidae) of America north of Mexico. Proceedings of the Russian Entomological Society 75(1), 134–52.
 Ghahari, H., et al. Bibliography of the family Braconidae (Hymenoptera: Ichneumonoidea) (1964–2003). NNM Technical Bulletin 8. 2006. ISSN 1387-0211
 van Achterberg, C. and C. O'Toole. (1993). Annotated catalogue of the types of Braconidae (Hymenoptera) in the Oxford University Museum. Zoologische Verhandelingen 287(1) 1–43.
 Species profiles from the University of Florida Institute of Food and Agricultural Sciences:
 Cotesia marginiventris
 Diachasmimorpha longicaudata 
 Doryctobracon areolatus
 Meteorus autographae
 Opius dissitus
 Utetes anastrephae

Further reading 
 Achterberg, C. van (1990): Illustrated key to the subfamilies of the Holarctic Braconidae (Hymenoptera: Ichneumonoidea) Zoologische Mededelingen Vol. 64 p.  1–20 PDF
 Achterberg, C. van (1993): Illustrated key to the subfamilies of the Braconidae (Hymenoptera: Ichneumonoidea) Zoologische Verhandelingen Vol. 283 p.  1–189 PDF

 
Apocrita families
Biological pest control wasps
Articles containing video clips